Massachusetts House of Representatives' 5th Worcester district in the United States is one of 160 legislative districts included in the lower house of the Massachusetts General Court. It covers parts of Hampshire County and Worcester County. Republican Donnie Berthiaume of Spencer has represented the district since 2015.

Towns represented
The district includes the following localities:
 Barre
 Brookfield
 East Brookfield
 Hardwick
 Hubbardston
 New Braintree
 North Brookfield
 Oakham
 part of Spencer
 part of Ware
 West Brookfield

The current district geographic boundary overlaps with that of the Massachusetts Senate's Worcester, Hampden, Hampshire and Middlesex district.

Former locales
The district previously covered:
 Fitchburg, circa 1872 
 Leominster, circa 1872 
 Lunenburg, circa 1872 
 Westminster, circa 1872

Representatives
 Thomas E. Glazier, circa 1858 
 William Mayo, circa 1859 
 George H. Coolidge, circa 1888 
 Henry D. Haynes, circa 1888 
 Wilfrid J. Lamoureux, circa 1920 
 Leo Joseph Cournoyer, circa 1951 
 John F. Farland, circa 1975 
 Donald R. Berthiaume, Jr, 2015-current

See also
 List of Massachusetts House of Representatives elections
 Other Worcester County districts of the Massachusetts House of Representatives: 1st, 2nd, 3rd, 4th, 6th, 7th, 8th, 9th, 10th, 11th, 12th, 13th, 14th, 15th, 16th, 17th, 18th
 Worcester County districts of the Massachusett Senate: 1st, 2nd; Hampshire, Franklin and Worcester; Middlesex and Worcester; Worcester, Hampden, Hampshire and Middlesex; Worcester and Middlesex; Worcester and Norfolk
 List of Massachusetts General Courts
 List of former districts of the Massachusetts House of Representatives

Images
Portraits of legislators

References

External links
 Ballotpedia
  (State House district information based on U.S. Census Bureau's American Community Survey).

House
Government in Worcester County, Massachusetts
Government of Hampshire County, Massachusetts